Kristoffer Tokstad (born 5 July 1991) is a Norwegian football midfielder, who currently plays for Mjøndalen in Norway.

Career
Before transferring to Lillestrøm he played youth football for Lørenskog IF. He signed for Lillestrøm SK in mid-season 2007, was immediately loaned out to Lørenskog again. He returned to Lillestrøm, and ahead of the 2009 season he played several friendly matches. He made his senior debut in June 2009, and played 10 matches in the 2009 season and 3 matches in the 2010 season. In the 2011 season he was loaned out to Strømmen IF.

In 2014, he joined Sarpsborg 08.

On the last day of the Norwegian summer transfer window 2016, he joined Strømsgodset Toppfotball.

In February 2023, Tokstad signed for Mjøndalen for the 2023 season.

Career statistics

Club

References

1991 births
Living people
People from Lørenskog
Norwegian footballers
Lillestrøm SK players
Strømmen IF players
Sarpsborg 08 FF players
Strømsgodset Toppfotball players
Eliteserien players
Norwegian First Division players
Association football midfielders
Sportspeople from Viken (county)